Andru Sinthiya Ratham is a 1977 Indian Tamil-language action film, directed by R. Sundaram and written by T. N. Balu. The film stars Jaishankar and Padmapriya. It was released on 14 January 1977.

Plot

Cast 

 Jaishankar
 Padmapriya
 Manorama
 Sunandhini
 Thengai Srinivasan
 S. A. Ashokan
 Vennira Aadai Moorthy
 S. V. Ramadas
 T. K. Ramachandran

Production 
Andru Sinthiya Ratham was written by T. N. Balu and directed by R. Sundaram. The film was produced by K. Balakrishnan, S. Kamatchi and R. M. Manikkam for Geetha Chitra. Cinematography was handled by Dutt, and editing by L. Balu. Another film with the same title began production in the 1960s, but was later dropped.

Soundtrack 
The soundtrack was composed by V. Kumar.

Release and reception 
Andru Sinthiya Ratham was released on 14 January 1977. Kanthan of Kalki criticised the film for not being thought provoking.

References

External links 
 

1970s Tamil-language films
1977 action films
Films scored by V. Kumar
Indian action films